Local elections took place in Pateros on Monday, May 9, 2022, as a part of the 2022 Philippine general election. Voters will elect candidates for the local elective posts in the municipality: the mayor, vice mayor, District representative of Pateros-Taguig, and councilors, six in each of the city's two legislative districts.

Background 
Incumbent mayor Miguel Ponce III was first elected in 2016 and re-elected in 2019. He is seeking his third and final consecutive term. Independent candidate Marilyn Chiong is challenging Ponce for the top post in Pateros.

Candidates

Administration coalition

Primary opposition coalition

Other candidates

Note 
1.The coalition did not field their candidate for mayor, instead they will support the candidacy of incumbent Mayor Miguel "Ike" Ponce III.

Results

Mayoral election 
Miguel "Ike" Ponce III ran for his third and final term as mayor. He defeated an Independent candidate Marilyn Chiong.

Vice Mayoral election 
Incumbent Gerald German was ineligible to run due to term limits. His party nominated Liga ng mga Barangay-Pateros President John Peter Marzan, who lost to engineer Carlo Santos.

Congressional election 
Incumbent Alan Peter Cayetano decided not to seek reelection to instead the run for senator. Outgoing Taguig vice mayor Ricardo Cruz Jr. defeated former congressman Arnel Cerafica's brother and 2019 candidate, Allan.

Council elections

1st District

2nd District

References 

2022 Philippine local elections
Elections in Pateros
May 2022 events in the Philippines
2022 elections in Metro Manila